Parwanaya or Panja (from Persian 'five') is a 5-day religious festival in the Mandaean calendar. The 5 epagomenals (extra days) inserted at the end of every Šumbulta (the 8th month) constitute the Parwanaya intercalary feast. The festival celebrates the five days that Hayyi Rabbi created the angels and the universe.

Origins
The epagomenals in the Egyptian calendar were also considered to be sacred days in Ancient Egypt, as they were considered to be the birthdays of different gods. Today in the Coptic calendar, these five days are designated by the Coptic Orthodox Church as feast days for different saints.

Rituals
The masbuta (baptism), Ṭabahata Masiqta (ascension of the soul ceremony for ancestors), and hawad mania rituals are held during the Parwanaya.

Texts
Mandaean texts containing instructions for rituals performed during the Parwanaya include the Šarḥ ḏ-Parwanaia ("The Scroll of the Parwanaya") and Šarḥ ḏ-Ṭabahata ("Scroll of the Ancestors").

Gallery
Gallery of Mandaeans celebrating Parwanaya on the banks of the Tigris River in Amarah, Maysan Governorate, Iraq on 17 March 2019:

See also
Mandaean calendar
Intercalary month (Egypt)
Dehwa Rabba

References

External links

Slideshow: The Iranian Mandaeans at Parwanaya (Panja) time (in Ahvaz, Iran)

Religious festivals in Iran
Festivals in Iraq
Mandaic words and phrases
Mandaean holidays